Ralph Widdrington may refer to:
Ralph Widdrington (academic) (died 1688), Regius Professor of Greek at Cambridge University
 Ralph Widdrington (MP) (c. 1640–1718), Member of Parliament for Berwick upon Tweed, 1685–1689